The 1966–67 international cricket season was from September 1966 to April 1967.

Season overview

November

Ceylon in Pakistan

December

West Indies in India

Australia in South Africa

January

West Indies in Ceylon

March

Australia in New Zealand

Ceylon in India

References

International cricket competitions by season
1966 in cricket
1967 in cricket